The Dangerous Wild Animals Act 1976 (22 July) is a law of the United Kingdom that was originally enacted to deal with the increasing fashion of people in the late-1960s and early-1970s keeping interesting pets which were often from the more dangerous species, as well as hybrids between wild and domestic species, such as wolfdogs and Bengal cats. It was increasingly seen as unacceptable—in regard to public safety—for the average citizen to be able to acquire a potentially dangerous animal without some form of regulatory control.

Its purpose was to ensure that when private individuals kept dangerous wild animals, they do so in circumstances which do not create a risk to the public, and which safeguard the welfare of the animals.

The Act's schedule designates the species covered, such as many primates, carnivores, larger or venomous reptiles, dangerous spiders and scorpions. Keeping such animals without a licence is unlawful and the state is also allowed to specify where and how the animal is to be kept. This law also requires keepers to have their animals covered by a satisfactory liability insurance policy.

How it works
Licences are required for any animal listed on a schedule under the law. These licences will only be granted when the authority is satisfied that it would not be contrary to public interest, not on the grounds of safety or nuisance and that the animal's accommodation is adequate and secure.

Where the local authority grant a licence it shall impose conditions on the licence covering issues such as: -

 a requirement that the animal be kept only by a person or persons named on the licence;
 restrictions on the movement of the animal from the premises as specified on the licence; and 
 a requirement that the licence holder has a current insurance policy which ensures both licence holders and others against any liability caused by the animal.

Species scheduled as dangerous
The act has two separate but almost identical schedules, respectively applicable to England and Wales and to Scotland. These give the scientific name of the relevant taxon, sometimes with a common name gloss.

Mammals:
 Macropodidae: the western grey, eastern grey, and red kangaroo; the wallaroo
 most primates; except night monkeys, titi, squirrel monkeys, bamboo lemurs, and Homo
 the Tasmanian devil
 All bears, camels, elephants, eared seals, Giraffidae, Hippopotamidae, Rhinocerotidae, peccary, tapir, and walrus
 the aardvark, fossa, giant armadillo, giant anteater, and pronghorn
 Bovidae except the domestic cattle, buffalo, goat, and sheep
 Canidae except the fox, culpeo, grey zorro, raccoon dogs, and domestic dog
 Equidae except the donkey and domestic horse
 Larger Felidae
 Many Mustelidae, but not the European otter
 Suidae except the domestic pig (farmed wild boar is also excepted in Scotland)
 Viverrinae except the small Indian civet
 True seals except the common seal and grey seal
 Hyenas except the aardwolf
 Moose and Caribou except domestic reindeer
 Many hybrids where one or both parents are classified as dangerous
Birds: 
 cassowary, ostrich
Reptiles:
 Crocodilians: all Alligatoridae, Crocodylidae, Gavialidae
 Snakes: all Atractaspis, Elapidae, Hydrophiidae, Viperidae; many Colubridae
 All Helodermatidae
Invertebrates:
 Spiders: All Ctenidae, Hexathelidae, Sicariidae, Theridiidae
 Scorpions: All Buthidae; and Hemiscorpius lepturus

References

External links

1976 in the environment
United Kingdom Acts of Parliament 1976
Wildlife law
Pets in the United Kingdom